Prost may refer to:

People
 Alain Prost (born 1955), French former Formula One driver and four times world champion,
Sharon Prost (born 1951), American federal judge
Michel Prost (born 1946), French former footballer
 Nicolas Prost (born 1981), French racing driver, son of Alain Prost

Other uses
 Prost Grand Prix, the Formula One racing team owned by Alain Prost from 1997 to 2002
 Prost, an honorary toast in German

See also 
 
 Proust (disambiguation)